Kripik or keripik are Indonesian chips or crisps, bite-size snack crackers that can be savoury or sweet. They are made from various dried fruits, tubers, vegetables, and fish that have undergone a deep frying process in hot vegetable oil. They can be lightly seasoned with salt, or spiced with chili powder and sugar.

Together with krupuk, the etymology of the term kripik is believed as an onomatopoeia in Indonesian to describe the crunch sound of this crispy snack.

Kripik (chips) and krupuk (crackers) are an integral part of Indonesian cuisine. Kripik commonly are made from dried slices of roots and tubers. The most popular are kripik singkong (cassava crackers) and kripik pisang (Banana chips); other types of fruit, yam or tuber crackers are also available.

Kripik and krupuk
Kripik is closely related to krupuk since it is popularly considered as a smaller sized krupuk. In Indonesia, the term krupuk refers to a type of relatively large crackers, while kripik or keripik refers to smaller bite-size crackers; the counterpart of chips (or crisps) in western cuisine. For example, potato chips are called kripik kentang in Indonesia. Usually krupuk are made from a dried paste consisting of a mixture of starch and other ingredients, while kripik are usually made entirely from a thinly sliced, sun-dried, and then deep-fried product without any mixture of starch.

Variants

Almost all type of fruits, nuts, tubers and plant products can be made into kripik. Other types of kripik can be coated with batter and deep fried until crispy and dry. In Indonesia, the latest popular snack is extra hot and spicy kripik.

 Emping is a type of kripik made from the melinjo (Gnetum gnemon) nut.
 Kripik apel, made from dried apple, originally produced in Malang, East Java
 Kripik bayam, made from spinach
 Kripik belut, made from battered and deep-fried eel
 Kripik ceker, made from deep-fried boneless chicken feet
 Kripik durian, from Medan
 Kripik gadung, made from gadung yam (Dioscorea hispida)
 Kripik jamur, made from mushrooms
 Kripik kentang, made from potatoes
 Kripik nangka, made from jackfruit
 Kripik oncom, made from oncom, similar to kripik tempeh but has slightly bitter taste
 Kripik pisang, made from dried banana
 Kripik salak, made from snake fruit
 Kripik sanjay or kripik singkong balado, thin crispy cassava coated with chili pepper and sugara popular snack from Bukittinggi, West Sumatra
 Kripik singkong, made of cassava. A spicy variant is available in Bandung, West Java, commonly called by its brand name maicih.
 Kripik sukun, made from breadfruit
 Kripik talas, made from taro
 Kripik tempe, made by deep-frying batter coated tempeh
 Keripik teripang, made from dried sea cucumbers
 Kripik ubi, made from sweet potatoes
 Kripik walang or kripik belalang, made from grasshoppers

Product

Kripik are traditionally made by a small-scale home industry. However, just like the potato chip industry in the western counterpart, in Indonesia today it is common to encounter mass-produced packed kripik snacks in warung shops, minimarkets and supermarkets. Some brands have mass-produced certain variants of kripik chips.

In Indonesia, kripiks are often sold as oleh-oleh or food gift to be brought home after travel. Certain areas has developed their specialty kripiks which depend on locally available ingredients and recipes. For example, Lampung is well known for its banana kripiks, Malang in East Java for its fruit-based kripiks, including apple and jackfruit kripiks, while Bandung is well known for its tempeh, oncom, tubers and sweet potato-based kripiks. Bukittinggi city in West Sumatra on the other hand, is famous for its Keripik sanjay, a hot and spicy cassava chips coated with balado chili sauce.

 the latest trend in Indonesia's kripik industry is extra hot kripiks with ample chili powder, which started with Keripik Pedas Maicih (Maicih spicy crackers) in Bandung in 2010. It is a bag of fiery hot cassava chips offered in different levels of spiciness. Subsequently, the popularity of extra hot kripik ' swept across nation.

Gallery

See also

 Kabkab
 Kiping
 Banana chips
 Potato chips
 Tempura

References

External links

Indonesian snack foods
Deep fried foods
Vegetarian dishes of Indonesia
Cassava dishes